Mecodema validum is a large-bodied ground beetle endemic to New Zealand. It is geographically widespread from Mt Te Aroha (north) to the Ruahine Ranges (south) with Ohakune as the type locality. This species is within the spiniferum group, there is variability in some of the external morphological characters along its distribution. However, the form of the male genitalia remains constant, except with a slight variation in the easternmost population in northern Hawke's Bay.

References 

validum
Taxa named by Thomas Broun
Beetles described in 1923